Word to the Jaz is the debut studio album by American rapper and producer The Jaz from New York City. It was released in 1989 via EMI USA, and produced by Bryan "Chuck" New, Pete Q. Harris and The Jaz. The album peaked at number 87 on the Top R&B/Hip-Hop Albums chart. It featured guest appearance from Jay-Z on the song "Hawaiian Sophie", which peaked at number 18 on the Hot Rap Songs chart. The single "Let's Play House"/"Buss the Speaker" peaked at number 26 on the Billboard Dance Club Songs chart.

Track listing

Personnel
 Jonathan Burks – main performer, producer
 Shawn Corey Carter – featured performer (track 3)
 Bryan Chuck New – producer
 Peter Brian Harris – producer
 Scott Folks – executive producer
 Carol Chen – art direction
 Henry Marquez – art direction
 Timothy White – photography

Charts 

Album

Singles

References

External links
 

1989 debut albums
EMI Records albums
Jaz-O albums
Albums produced by Jaz-O